Sulfanyl (•), also known as the mercapto radical, hydrosulfide radical, or hydridosulfur, is a simple radical molecule consisting of one hydrogen and one sulfur atom. The radical appears in metabolism in organisms as H2S is detoxified. Sulfanyl is one of the top three sulfur-containing gasses in gas giants such as Jupiter and is very likely to be found in brown dwarfs and cool stars. It was originally discovered by Margaret N. Lewis and John U. White at the University of California in 1939. They observed molecular absorption bands around 325 nm belonging to the system designated by 2Σ+ ← 2Πi.  They generated the radical by means of a radio frequency discharge in hydrogen sulfide. HS• is formed during the degradation of hydrogen sulfide in the atmosphere of the Earth.  This may be a deliberate action to destroy odours or a natural phenomenon.

The organic analogue of sulfanyl is thiyl radical with the formula RS., where R = alkyl or aryl.

Natural occurrence
Absorption lines of sulfanyl in space were first detected in the infrared by Yamamura (2000) in a star R And. In the sun •SH was detected at several ultraviolet wavelengths: 326.0459, 327.5468, 328.9749, 330.0892 and 330.1112 nm.

Sulfanyl has been detected in interstellar gas, and it is possibly present in comets.

Various theoretical studies have examined HS• in atmospheres. In Earth's atmosphere
HS• reacts with NO2 to make two products HSNO2 and HSONO.  HSONO decomposes to HSO and NO.
HS• also reacts with O2 and N2O. HS• can also react with Cl2 producing HSCl and a Cl• atom. HS• destroys ozone producing HSO• and oxygen.  HS• is formed in the Earth's atmosphere by the reaction of HO•, the hydroxyl radical, on carbon disulfide, carbon oxysulfide and hydrogen sulfide with side products of carbon dioxide and water.  Photodissociation of hydrogen sulfide also produces the radical in air.

In a planetary atmosphere that contains H2S, HS• will be formed if the temperature and pressure are high enough.
The ratio of H2S and HS• is given by:

log(X/X) = −3.37 + 8785/T + 0.5 log PT + 0.5 log XH2

For a hydrogen dominated atmosphere in a gas giant or star: H2S has the same level as HS• at 
.
At higher temperatures HS• breaks up into sulfur vapour and H2.  The line of equal S and HS concentration follows the line
.  
The lines of equal concentration cross at 1509 K and 1.51 Pa, with HS• being left out of the mix at lower temperatures and pressures. •SH is expected to be the second or third most common sulfur containing gas in gas giants or brown dwarfs.

Formation
Thermal decomposition of mercaptans, such as ethyl mercaptan yields •.

The radical can be formed by the action of ultraviolet radiation on hydrogen sulfide, which splits off a hydrogen atom.  A wavelength of 190 nm gives maximum absorption.

In humans superoxide dismutase [Cu-Zn] converts the hydrosulfide ion (HS−) to •.  This happens as the Cu2+ ion in the enzyme is converted to Cu+.

Sulfide dehydrogenase as found in sulfur bacteria catalyses the oxidation of HS− to •, by removing a single electron.

When sulfur minerals are leached with ferric ions HS• is formed in this way:

MS + Fe3+ + 2H+ → M2+ + Fe2+ + H2S•+

with the H2S•+ radical then passing a proton to water to make the HS• radical. M is a metal such as zinc or copper.  This has potential for bioleaching in metallic ore extraction.

The hydrosulfide ion HS− can be oxidized to HS• with cerium (IV) sulfate.

Reactions
Being a radical, HS• is quite reactive. In water HS can react with O2 producing SO2− and H+. SO2− reacts further with O2 to make SO2 and superoxide O2−. In water HS• has an equilibrium with S− • and H+. The hydroxyl radical •OH combines with H2S to form HS• and water.  Other reactions investigated by Tiee (1981) are HS• + ethylene, HS• + O2 → HO• + SO, and reactions with itself HS• + HS• → H2S2 or H2 and S.  The disulfide can further react with HS• to make the disulfide radical HS–S• and H2S.

Properties
The ionization energy of HS is 10.4219 eV. The reduction potential to go to HS− is 0.92 eV. HS• in water can ionize to S•− and H+. The S•− can catalyze a cis-trans conversion in lipids.

The interatomic distance between sulfur and hydrogen in the radical is 0.134 nm.

HS• reacts with carboxylic acids to make carbonyl sulfide (COS) and probably is the main source of this substance in the atmosphere of Earth.

Related molecules
HS—S• is called disufanyl with lengthening chains as trisulfanyl, tetrasulfanyl and pentasulfanyl HSSSSS•. S−* is termed sulfanidyl.
HS+ is known as sulfanylium, and the common hydrosulfide ion HS− is also known as sulfanido for a ligand or sulfanide as an anion.  Further down the periodic table, HSe• is known as selanyl, and HTe• is termed tellanyl.

References

External links
Mercapto radical from NIST

 Sulfur deuteride radical SD• microwave spectrum

Hydrides
Sulfur compounds